This is a list of Japanese soups and stews. Japanese cuisine is the food—ingredients, preparation and way of eating—of Japan. The phrase  refers to the makeup of a typical meal served, but has roots in classic kaiseki, honzen, and  cuisine. The term is also used to describe the first course served in standard kaiseki cuisine nowadays.

Japanese soups and stews

Soup/Shirumono 
 Butajiru – Also known as tonjiru. Soup made with pork and vegetables, flavoured with miso.
 Dashi – a class of soup and cooking stock used in Japanese cuisine.
 Sweet corn porridge soup.
 Kasujiru
 Kenchin jiru
  Miso soup 
 Noppe 
 Ohaw
 Suimono - generic name for clear traditional soups
 Ushiojiru – clear soup of clams
 Torijiru – Chicken soup
 Zenzai – In Okinawa Prefecture, refers to red bean soup served over shaved ice with mochi
 Zōni

Noodle soup 
 Champon – Noodle dish that is a regional cuisine of Nagasaki, Japan.
 Hōtō – Regional dish made by stewing flat udon noodles and vegetables in miso soup. 
 Instant noodles
 Cup Noodle
 Okinawa soba
  Ramen 
 Tonkotsu ramen
 Udon - many variations, including Kitsune udon topped with aburaage (sweetened deep-fried tofu pockets)

Stew/Nimono 
 Cream stew – Yōshoku dish consisting of meat and mixed vegetables cooked in thick white roux. 
 "Gyusuji Nikomi" or Motsu Nikomi
 Nikujaga 
 Zosui

Hot pot/Nabemono 
 Chankonabe – Stew commonly eaten by sumo wrestlers as part of a weight-gain diet.
 Dojō nabe - loach, tokusanhin of Asakusa in Tokyo
 Fugu chiri - pufferfish
 Harihari-nabe – minke whale meat and mizuna
 Imoni  - beef and potatoes
 Kiritanpo
 Motsunabe 
 Oden 
 Shabu-shabu 
 Sukiyaki

See also

 Aonori – is a type of edible green seaweed used in Japanese soups and other dishes
 Asian soup
 Japanese noodles
 List of Japanese condiments
 List of Japanese dishes
 List of Japanese desserts and sweets
 List of Japanese ingredients
 List of ramen dishes
 List of soups
 List of stews
 Tsukemen

References
 

 
Japan
Soups